Tal Rosner (born in Jerusalem, 9 June 1978) is a London-based Israeli filmmaker and video artist.

Biography
Tal Rosner is a graduate of Bezalel Academy of Art and Design in Jerusalem (2000–03) and Central Saint Martins College of Art and Design in London (2003–05).

Film career
In May 2008, Rosner won a BAFTA for Best Title Sequence for the E4 teen drama Skins at the British Academy Television Craft Awards.

Since 2005, Rosner has collaborated with various musicians, including: Katia and Marielle Labeque, New World Symphony Orchestra and Michael Tilson Thomas, Esa-Pekka Salonen and Jennifer Koh. His video for In Seven Days, Piano Concerto with Moving Image, composed by Thomas Adès, was premiered by the London Sinfonietta at the Royal Festival Hall in London on 28 April 2008. The work was co-commissioned by the Southbank Centre and the Los Angeles Philharmonic.

His experimental film Without You (2008), commissioned by Animate Projects for Channel 4 and Arts Council England had earned Rosner screenings at film-festivals and venues worldwide, including Clermont-Ferrand, Rotterdam, Tribeca (NYC), Onedotzero and Tate Modern in London, as well as TV broadcasts in the UK and France/Canal +. Family Tree (2010) is a seven channel video and sound installation at Tenderpixel Gallery, exhibited from 11 February to 6 March 2010.

He entered a civil partnership, later terminated, with British composer Thomas Adès in 2006.

In 2009, Rosner was commissioned by Sony London to create a short film of world first television moments to mark the launch of four Sony BRAVIA LCD TVs with World First innovations.

Key works
Polaris (2010, Composed by Thomas Adès)
Lachen verlernt (2009, Composed by Esa-Pekka Salonen, Violin: Jennifer Koh)
Without You (2008, for Animate Projects)
In Seven Days (2008, composed by Thomas Adès)
Skins/Title Sequences, series 1-6 (2007 - current)
Stravinsky Concerto for Two Pianos (2006, for Katia and Marielle Labeque)
Debussy En Blanc et Noir (2006, for Katia and Marielle Labeque playing En blanc et noir)

References

External links

Tal Rosner/Animate Projects
Tal Rosner/LUX

1978 births
British video artists
English LGBT people
BAFTA winners (people)
Living people
Alumni of Central Saint Martins
Bezalel Academy of Arts and Design alumni